Esther Peled is an Israeli writer and a psychologist.

She was born and lives in Israel. When doing her B.S. degree in literature and psychology she had courses in haiku and Zen buddhism, which made an impact on her work and writings, although she does not identify herself as a Buddhist.  She earned M.S. in clinical psychology and Ph.D. in philosophy.

Works
2017:Widely Open Underneath, a book of short stories. Taken together, they tell a larger story of the life of a woman from a small community.
2012: The Clear Light of Reality, twelve short stories, the first book of prose. The stories of the book are "laden with human grief (in love, parting, longing, loneliness, betrayal, anger)", and only the last one suggests some hope.
She also published several books in psychotherapy, including,
2005: פסיכואנליזה ובודהיזם : על היכולת האנושית לדעת (Psychoanalysis and Buddhism: About the Capacity to Know)
2007: להרבות טוב בעולם: בודהיזם, מדיטציה פסיכותרפיה (To multiply good in the world: Buddhism, Meditation, Psychotherapy)
2022 פתיחות מלאה וספק: שיחות על פסיכותרפיה ודת (Full openness and doubt: Talks on Psychotherapy and Religion)

Awards
2017: Sapir Prize for Literature, for  Widely Open Underneath

References

External links
אסתי פלד: לא ערוך, Estreh Peled's blog

Year of birth missing (living people)
Living people
21st-century Israeli women writers
21st-century Israeli writers
Israeli psychologists
Israeli women psychologists
Recipients of Prime Minister's Prize for Hebrew Literary Works